is a passenger railway station located in the city of Ōmihachiman, Shiga Prefecture, Japan, operated by the West Japan Railway Company (JR West).

Lines

Station layout
The station consists of one side platform and one island platform connected by an elevated station building. The station is staffed.

Platforms

History
Azuchi Station opened on 25 April 1914 as a station for both passenger and freight operations on the Japanese Government Railway (JGR), which became the Japan National Railway (JNR) after World War II.  Freight operations ceased on 15 March 1972. The station became part of the West Japan Railway Company on 1 April 1987 due to the privatization and dissolution of the JNR. 

Station numbering was introduced in March 2018 with Azuchi being assigned station number JR-A18.

The station was remodeled to resemble a Japanese castle in 2019.

Passenger statistics
In fiscal 2019, the station was used by an average of 2,586 passengers daily (boarding passengers only).

Surrounding area
Omihachiman City Azuchi Elementary School
 Azuchi Castle Museum 
 Shiga Prefectural Azuchi Castle Archaeological Museum

See also
List of railway stations in Japan

References

External links

JR West official home page

Railway stations in Japan opened in 1914
Tōkaidō Main Line
Railway stations in Shiga Prefecture
Ōmihachiman, Shiga